Julien Delannoy (born 15 June 1995) is a French rugby union player. His position is lock or  flanker and he currently plays for Pau in the French Top 14.

References

External links
  Julien Delannoy on lnr.fr
  Julien Delannoy on montpellier-rugby.com

1995 births
Living people
French rugby union players
Montpellier Hérault Rugby players
Rugby union locks
Section Paloise players
People from Villeneuve-d'Ascq
Sportspeople from Nord (French department)
CA Brive players